Joshua Hayden Cunningham is an Australian guitarist, vocalist and songwriter who is one-third of folk rock band the Waifs. His involvement with the Waifs has resulted in a total of four Australian Recording Industry Association (ARIA) Award wins, all in 2003 for Up All Night and ten further nominations. Cunningham has released five studio albums with The Waifs and co-writes songs with fellow members Donna Simpson and Vikki Thorn, including "Lighthouse", which was nominated for ARIA Award for Single of the Year at the ARIA Music Awards of 2003.

Cunningham has been a regular member of Missy Higgins's backing band, performed on her album On a Clear Night and appeared in her live shows. He has constructed some of the guitars he plays, both acoustic and electric.

Biography
Joshua Cunningham grew up on a farm in Moruya, New South Wales, and picked up his first guitar in 1987.  He met Donna and Vikki Simpson while the two sisters  played gigs in Broome, in 1992.  At the time, Cunningham played bass guitar in an all-male band.  Donna Simpson described, on The Waifs' official website, how they met:  Cunningham has been a member of The Waifs ever since.

Discography

Solo studio albums

Awards and nominations

AIR Awards
The Australian Independent Record Awards (commonly known informally as AIR Awards) is an annual awards night to recognise, promote and celebrate the success of Australia's Independent Music sector.

|-
| 2022
| The Song Club (with Felicity Urquhart)
| Best Independent Country Album or EP
|

ARIA Music Awards
The ARIA Music Awards is an annual ceremony presented by Australian Recording Industry Association (ARIA), which recognise excellence, innovation, and achievement across all genres of the music of Australia. They commenced in 1987.

! 
|-
| 2021|| The Song Club (with Felicity Urquhart)|| ARIA Award for Best Country Album || 
| 
|-

Country Music Awards of Australia
The Country Music Awards of Australia is an annual awards night held in January during the Tamworth Country Music Festival. Celebrating recording excellence in the Australian country music industry. They commenced in 1973.
 

! 
|-
|rowspan="4"| 2022 || Felicity Urquhart & Josh Cunningham ||  Group or Duo of the Year ||  ||rowspan="4"| 
|-
| The Song Club || Alt. Country Album of the Year || 
|-
| The Song Club || Album of the Year  || 
|-
| "Spare Parts" || Video of the Year || 
|-
| 2023 || "Bogswamp" (written by Josh Cunningham) – Recorded by Felicity Urquhart & Josh Cunningham || Heritage Song of the Year ||  || | 
|-

References

 

Musicians from Western Australia
Australian guitarists
Living people
Year of birth missing (living people)
Place of birth missing (living people)